Faceplate (face plate, face-plate) is a plate, cover, or bezel on the front of a device, such as:

Computers and electronics
 Electrical outlet, also referred to as a wall plate, outlet cover, or socket cover
 Front panel, of computers
 Head unit, stereo system component
 Motherboard, input/output port panel such as on an ATX
 Cover (container)
 Faceplate (housing), decorative elements of housing
 Nokia 5110, mobile phone with interchangeable faceplates
 Interchangeable bezels for Game Boy Micro
 Interchangeable bezels for Nintendo 3DS
 Interchangeable bezels for Nintendo 2DS
 Interchangeable decorative front plates for Nintendo Wii Remote musical instrument controllers
 Interchangeable decorative front plates for PlayStation 3 rhythm game peripherals
 Interchangeable decorative front case panels for Xbox 360

Underwater diving
 Single-lens diving mask
 Window fronting a single-lens diving mask

Other uses
 Lathe faceplate, accessory for a wood or metal turning lathe
 Lockset, components that make up the locking or latching mechanism
 Stem (bicycle part), connects the handlebars to the steerer tube of the bicycle fork
 Wallpaper steamer, an electrical device which boils water continuously to produce steam

See also
 Bezel (disambiguation)
 Cover (disambiguation)
 Instrument panel (disambiguation)
 Plate (disambiguation)
 Wallplate (disambiguation)